Xiong Liang (熊亮) is a Chinese illustrator. (He is also known as Kim Xiong.)

Awards and honours
 2018 Shortlisted for the Hans Christian Andersen Award
 2017 Winner of a Chen Bochui Children's Literature Award - for Walk With the Wind 《和风一起散步》

Books
 《兔儿爷》 The Toy Rabbit Story, Heryin Books, Inc., USA, 2005.
 《小石狮》 A Little Stone Lion
 《土将》 The Earthen General
 《小年兽》 The New Year Monster
 《灶王爷》 Kitchen God
 《武松打虎》 《Wu Song Fights the Tiger》
 Family Tree
 《屠龙族》 Dragon Slayers
 《梅雨怪》 Monster Plum Rain
 《一切有心》 All Determined To
 《月亮朋友》 The Moon, My Friend
 《月亮上的筵席》 Teatime on the Moon  (2012)
 《野孩子》 The Wild Child  (2013)
 《和风一起散步》 Walk With the Wind
 《中国经典 1》Classical Chinese Stories 1
 《中国经典 2》Classical Chinese Stories 2
 《中国经典 3》Classical Chinese Stories 3
 《中国经典 4》Classical Chinese Stories 4
 《中国经典 5》Classical Chinese Stories 5
 《长坂坡》
 《金刚师》
 《金刚师》
 《穿墙术》
 《南瓜和尚》
 《一园青菜成了精》
 《大鸟的自行车房》
 Le chat general Zhang Fei
 Le gentil monstre

Further reading
 "Captivating characters" by Mei Jia, China Daily, 14 Aug 2012
 "Lunar Meditations: Drawings by Xiong Liang", by Alina, literaryvittles, 4 Feb 2014
 熊亮:《我为什么做中国绘本》，22 Mar 2008 (in Chinese)

References

External links

 Xiong Liang on Wordcat
 Xiong Liang on Weibo

Living people
Chinese illustrators
Chinese children's book illustrators
Year of birth missing (living people)